Leenalchi is a South Korean pansori pop band formed in 2019.

Members 
The band has a unique lineup, with three female and one male traditional Korean singers, two bassists and a drummer. The four traditional singers are graduates of Seoul National University's traditional music department. Bassist Jang Young-gyu scored the films "The Wailing" (2016) and "Train to Busan" (2016) and played bass for SsingSsing. Fellow bassist Jeong Jung-yeop previously played bass for Kiha and the Faces. Drummer Lee Chul-hee was also drummer for SsingSsing. The band is named after Lee Nal-chi, a pansori master and jultagi performer of the 1880s. All members participate in coming up with a song in a rhythmic way, "like a Wikipedia article written by many contributors". The band members met during a 2018 performance of "Dragon King" at the Asia Culture Center in Gwangju.

Work 
Their first album was influenced by the pansori play Sugungga. The band released its track "Tiger is Coming" as a non-fungible token.

Reception 
The band has achieved considerable success, appearing in the Korea Tourism Organization "Feel the Rhythm of Korea" video series promoting the cities of Seoul, Busan, Jeonju, Mokpo, Andong, Gangneung, and Incheon and winning three prizes at the Korean Music Awards in 2021 for Musician of the Year, Best Modern Rock Song, and Best Jazz & Crossover Album. Judges called it the "sexiest album of 2020". The band frequently collaborates with Ambiguous Dance Company.

References

External links

 Leenalchi on Instagram
 Leenalchi on Bandcamp
 Leenalchi on YouTube

Korean pop music groups
Korean music
Korean traditional music